The 307th Hospital of the Chinese People's Liberation Army, commonly called the 307 Hospital, is a hospital in China. It is in Fengtai District, Beijing. The hospital combines medical treatment, research, and educational studies into a comprehensive hospital, which is one of the first designated medical institutions with medical insurance coverage in Beijing. 307 Hospital of PLA is appointed as the National Clinical Hospital of Disease Control.

History
The hospital was formerly the Isotope Hospital of Ministry of Health, founded in Haidian District Beijing in 1957. In 1958, the hospital had transferred to the People's Liberation Army and renamed 307 Hospital of PLA.

In September 1981, 307 Hospital of PLA started to use the name of the Affiliated Hospital of Military Medical Sciences. At the same time, it also uses the name of 307 Hospital of PLA.

In June 1983, 307 Hospital of PLA became a division-level hospital.

In September 2005, the whole hospital was moved to Fengtai District from Haidian District.

In 2012, 307 Hospital of PLA was awarded as a class 1, Grade 3 general hospital.

Medical facilities
The hospital has over 1500 beds and 48 medical departments, such as hematology, ophthalmology, traditional Chinese medicine, etc. The radiology department provides medical service to over 20,000 patients annually.

Features Sections
The Hematology Department treatment centers include the Bone Marrow Transplant Center, Radiology Center, and Blood Collection and Donation Center. Here, more than one thousand leukemia patients have received the conventional bone marrow transplant.

In 2004, Huisheng Ai, the director of the Hematology Department, initially developed microtransplantation whose advantage is requiring the HLA mismatched donor instead of the HLA matched donor which is the first obstacle for patients to receive treatment. With the research step-by-step, microtransplantation technology has matured and been approved by the clinical studies with its high survival rate, less toxicity, and no GVHD (graft-verse-host-disease). By 2015, more than 200 patients have been cured by microtransplantation.

Honors and important events
In 2003, 307 Hospital of PLA was awarded Advanced Unit of State-level Anti-terrorism Exercise.

In 2006, 307 Hospital of PLA was awarded Advanced Unit on Aiding the Western Regions

In 2007, 307 Hospital of PLA was awarded Beijing Modern Unit.

In 2011, 307 Hospital of PLA was awarded Beijing Exemplary Unit of Serving the Elderly.

In 2012, 307 Hospital of PLA was honored with the title of Beijing Demonstration Unit of High Quality Nursing Service. At the same year, the hospital was also awarded Advanced Unit and Model Base of PLA Tumor Nursing.

In 2014, 307 Hospital of PLA was awarded Advanced Unit of the first AMMS (Academy of Military Medical of Sciences) Multimedia Prize.

In August 2014, the 4th Seminar of Hospital Disinfection was held by 307 Hospital of PLA.

In October 2014, 307 Hospital of PLA held the 3rd International Microtransplantation Conference

In August 2014, medical team of 307 Hospital of PLA aided the frontier army in Neimenggu province.

In December 2014, hematology department of 307 Hospital cooperated with ZMKS Biotech, a famous biotechnology company in China, to provide better service for hematological patients.

Notable doctors
Hematology department: Huisheng Ai, Guo Mei, Changlin Yu, Jianhui Qiao, etc.

HSCT (Hematopoietic Stem Cell Transplantation) department: Chen Hu, Liangding Hu, etc.

Neurosurgery: Duan Lian, Weijian Sun, Shubin Liu, Huang Yan, etc.

See also
301 Hospital

References
https://archive.today/20160117033408/http://www.307hospital.com/yyjjnew.jhtml#location  ; 
http://www.307hospital.com/lsyg.jhtml; 
http://www.307hospital.com/yyry.jhtml; 
http://www.307hospital.com/xwdt/index.jhtml; 
https://web.archive.org/web/20150403114139/http://www.307hospital.com/zjtd/index.jhtml#zmzj;

People's Liberation Army
Hospitals in Beijing
Military hospitals in China
Hospitals established in 1957
Hospital buildings completed in 1957